Citrinophila similis, the similar yellow, is a butterfly in the family Lycaenidae. It is found in Guinea, Sierra Leone, Ivory Coast, Ghana, southern Nigeria, and Cameroon. Its habitat consists of forests.

References

Butterflies described in 1887
Poritiinae
Taxa named by William Forsell Kirby
Butterflies of Africa